The Boyce Baronetcy, of Badgeworth in the County of Gloucester, is a title in the Baronetage of the United Kingdom. It was created on 24 November 1952 for the Australia-born Conservative politician Leslie Boyce. He represented Gloucester in the House of Commons from 1929 to 1945.   the title is now held by his grandson, the third Baronet, who succeeded his father in 1968.

Boyce baronets, of Badgeworth (1952)

Sir (Harold) Leslie Boyce, 1st Baronet (1895–1955)
Sir Richard Leslie Boyce, 2nd Baronet (1929–1968)
Sir Robert Charles Leslie Boyce, 3rd Baronet (born 1962)

Notes

References
Kidd, Charles, Williamson, David (editors). Debrett's Peerage and Baronetage (1990 edition). New York: St Martin's Press, 1990, 

Boyce